Sib-e Madab-e Sofla (also Romanized as Sīb-e Madāb-e Soflá; also known as Sīb-e Madāb) is a village in Sarrud-e Shomali Rural District, in the Central District of Boyer-Ahmad County, Kohgiluyeh and Boyer-Ahmad Province, Iran. At the 2006 census, its population was 25, in 5 families.

References 

Populated places in Boyer-Ahmad County